Marko Putinčanin (Serbian Cyrillic: Марко Путинчaнин ;born 16 December 1987) is a Serbian footballer, who plays for FK Napredak Kruševac. He can play either as a midfielder or a right-back.

Club career
Putinčanin has played in his home country clubs Radnički Nova Pazova, Zemun, and Bežanija, before joining Albanian club Dinamo Tirana in 2009.

In December 2014, Putinčanin left Zhetysu after one season with the club.

In January 2018, Putinčanin signed an 18-month-deal with Serbian club Vojvodina.

In late June 2018, Putinčanin signed for Slovenian club Olimpija Ljubljana.

Honours
Levadia Tallinn
Meistriliiga:2021
Estonian Supercup: 2022

Olimpija Ljubljana
 Slovenian Cup: 2018–19, 2020–21

Dinamo Tirana
 Kategoria Superiore: 2009–10

References

External links
 

1989 births
Living people
Serbian footballers
Serbian expatriate footballers
Footballers from Belgrade
Association football midfielders
Association football fullbacks
Serbian First League players
Serbian SuperLiga players
Kategoria Superiore players
Slovenian PrvaLiga players
Kazakhstan Premier League players
FK Zemun players
FK Bežanija players
FK Radnik Surdulica players
FK Dinamo Tirana players
FK Voždovac players
NK Olimpija Ljubljana (2005) players
FC Zhetysu players
Navbahor Namangan players
FCI Levadia Tallinn players
FK Napredak Kruševac players
Expatriate footballers in Albania
Serbian expatriate sportspeople in Albania
Expatriate footballers in Kazakhstan
Serbian expatriate sportspeople in Kazakhstan
Expatriate footballers in Slovenia
Serbian expatriate sportspeople in Slovenia
Serbian expatriate sportspeople in Estonia
Expatriate footballers in Estonia
Meistriliiga players